3C 171 is a Seyfert galaxy located in the constellation Lynx.

See also
 Lists of galaxies

References

External links
 www.jb.man.ac.uk/atlas/

Seyfert galaxies
Lynx (constellation)
171
2817570
54.11